Symplocos pendula grows as a tree up to  tall, with a trunk diameter of up to . Bark is dark brown. Its fragrant flowers feature a white, cream or pink corolla. Fruit is reddish green. S. pendula is found in Japan, China, Taiwan, Burma, Indochina, Malaysia and Indonesia.

References

pendula
Plants described in 1848
Trees of Japan
Trees of China
Trees of Taiwan
Trees of Indo-China
Trees of Malesia